Llancaiach is a hamlet just north of the village of Nelson, Caerphilly, Wales.

Villages in Caerphilly County Borough